Valli is the sixth solo LP album by Frankie Valli of The Four Seasons, released by Private Stock under catalog number PS-2017 as a stereo recording in 1976.  It was reissued on compact disc in 2008, paired with his first solo effort from Private Stock, Closeup, by Collector's Choice.

The LP yielded one hit single, "We're All Alone."  It reached #78 U.S. Billboard, #74 Cash Box and #73 in Canada. Despite the single’s moderate success, the album failed to make the charts.

Track listing

Four Seasons personnel on this album
 Frankie Valli - vocals
 Bob Gaudio - producer, keyboards, piano
 Don Ciccone - bass guitar
 Gerry Polci - drums
 Lee Shapiro - keyboards
 John Paiva - lead guitar

References

1976 albums
Frankie Valli albums
Albums produced by Bob Gaudio
Private Stock Records albums